The Everett Water Pollution Control Facility is a wastewater treatment plant in Everett, Washington, United States. It serves the city of Everett and discharges treated water into the Snohomish River. The facility is located at the south end of Smith Island, adjacent to Interstate 5 and Spencer Island Regional Park, a noted birdwatching spot.

A mechanical treatment plant was opened in 1991 to accelerate water cleaning. Both systems were expanded in 2005–2007 to treat a combined  of wastewater per day. The expansion also included measures to reduce foul odors from the plant, including lids on processing tanks and bio filters.

References

Further reading
Fact Sheet for NPDES Permit WA0024490, Washington State Department of Ecology, 2015

External links

 

Buildings and structures in Everett, Washington
Sewage treatment plants in Washington  (state)